Żelazów may refer to the following places in Poland:
Żelazów, Lower Silesian Voivodeship (south-west Poland)
Żelazów, Masovian Voivodeship (east-central Poland)